The Miss Guatemala 2011 pageant was held on November 25, 2011 at Centro de Convenciones Ilumina in the capital city Guatemala City, Guatemala. This year only 18 candidates were competing for the national crown. The chosen winner will represent Guatemala at the Miss Universe 2012 and at Miss Continente Americano 2012. The winner of best national costume, the costume will be use in Miss Universe 2012. Miss World Guatemala will represent Guatemala at the Miss World 2012. Miss Guatemala Internacional will represent Guatemala at the Miss International 2012. The First Runner-Up will enter Miss Intercontinental 2012 and the Second Runner-Up will enter Top Model of the World 2012. The Top 10 Semifinalists entered Reina Internacional del Café 2012, Reina Hispanoamericana 2012, Reina Mundial del Banano 2012, Miss Globe International 2012, and Miss Tourism International 2012.

Final results

Special Awards
 Miss Photogenic – Andrea Morales  (Chimaltenango)
 Miss Congeniality  – Yasmina Pacay  (Alta Verapaz)
 Best National Costume – Stephanie Ramírez  (Huehuetenango)

Final Competition Scores

 Winner 
 Miss World Guatemala
 Miss Guatemala Internacional
 First Runner-Up
 Second Runner-Up
 Top 10 Semifinalists

Official Delegates

External links
Official Website

Miss Guatemala
2011 beauty pageants